Robert Malcolm McRae Jr. (December 31, 1921 – June 25, 2004) was a United States district judge of the United States District Court for the Western District of Tennessee.

Education and career

Born in Memphis, Tennessee, McRae received a Bachelor of Arts degree from Vanderbilt University in 1943 and was a United States Naval Reserve Lieutenant during World War II, from 1943 to 1946. He received a Bachelor of Laws from the University of Virginia School of Law in 1948. He was in private practice in Memphis from 1948 to 1964. He was an assistant city attorney of Memphis from 1961 to 1964. He was a judge of the 15th Judicial Circuit Court in Memphis from 1964 to 1966.

Federal judicial service

McRae was nominated by President Lyndon B. Johnson on September 22, 1966, to a seat on the United States District Court for the Western District of Tennessee vacated by Judge Marion Speed Boyd. He was confirmed by the United States Senate on October 20, 1966, and received his commission on November 3, 1966. He served as Chief Judge from 1979 to 1986. He assumed senior status on December 31, 1986. McRae served in that capacity until his death on June 25, 2004.

Notable case

One of McRae's notable cases was Northcross v. Board of Education, which implemented desegregation busing in the now defunct Memphis City Schools.

References

Sources
 

1921 births
2004 deaths
Judges of the United States District Court for the Western District of Tennessee
United States district court judges appointed by Lyndon B. Johnson
20th-century American judges
United States Navy officers
United States Navy personnel of World War II